Hanyang may refer to:

China
Hanyang District (漢陽區, 汉阳区, Hànyáng Qū), Wuhan, Hubei
Hanyang Arsenal (漢陽兵工廠), founded in 1891 as one of the oldest modern arsenals in Chinese history
Hanyang 88 (漢陽八八式步槍), Chinese rifle used in the Second Sino-Japanese War
Hanyang (寒阳镇), a town in Lushan District, Jiujiang, Jiangxi
Hanyang (韩阳镇), a town in Yongji City, Shanxi
Tianshui in Gansu, formerly known as Hanyang
Hanyang Commandery (漢陽郡, 汉阳郡, Hànyángjùn), a medieval administrative division of China
Hanyang County (漢陽縣, 汉阳县, Hànyángxiàn), a medieval administrative division of China

South Korea
Seoul, formerly named Hanyang (한양; 漢陽)
Hanyang University (한양대학교; 漢陽大學校), with a main campus in Seoul and a second campus in Ansan